Randy Brown may refer to:

Randy Brown (fighter) (born 1990), Jamaican-American mixed martial artist
Randy Brown (basketball) (born 1968), American retired basketball player
Randy Brown (politician) (born 1967), American politician, former mayor of Evesham Township
Randy Brown (baseball) (1943–1998), American baseball catcher
Randy Brown (musician) (born 1952), American R&B musician

See also
J. Randall Brown (1851–1926), American mentalist